Capp or CAPP may refer to:

In science and technology
 Computer-aided Process Planning, activities and functions to prepare plans and instructions to manufacture a part or product
 Computer-aided Production Planning, variant of Computer-aided Process Planning
 Controlled Access Protection Profile, a set of functional and assurance security requirements for information technology products
 Content Addressable Parallel Processor, type of parallel processor which uses content-addressing memory (CAM) principles
 Ceramide-activated protein phosphatase, a group of enzymes involved in second-messaging systems

Other uses
 Capp (surname)
 Andy Capp, British comic strip and fictional character
 Californians Allied for Patient Protection, coalition to protect the Medical Injury Compensation Reform Act of 1975 (MICRA)
 Canadian Association of Petroleum Producers, voice of the upstream Canadian oil and natural gas industry
 Canadians Against Proroguing Parliament
 Canadians Advocating Political Participation
 Centesimus Annus Pro Pontifice, a foundation established in 1993
 Central African Power Pool

See also

 
 
 Capps (disambiguation)
 CAPPE (disambiguation)
 CAP (disambiguation)
 Cap (disambiguation)